Selma Mutal (born in Lima, Peru) is a Franco-Dutch film score composer. She is known for her collaborations with filmmakers Claudia Llosa, Javier Fuentes-León, and Tod Lending. Mutal has also scored films directed by Fabien Gorgeart, Piotr Dumala, Pola Rapaport, and Víctor García León, work for TV, and a Chanel campaign, among other things.

Early life
Mutal was born in Lima, Peru to Dutch parents. She studied music composition at the National Conservatory of Amsterdam and film scoring at the École Normale de Musique in Paris. Mutal also studied piano improvisation with the jazz pianist and composer Misha Mengelberg.

Career
Mutal embarked on her career composing for dance, theatre, and television. In 2003, she started working in film. French music publisher Frédéric Leibovitz Editeur produces many of her soundtracks.

Filmography
 The Best Families (Las Mejores Familias) (2020, dir. Javier Fuentes-León)
 El Día de mi Suerte, TV miniseries (2019, dir. Daniel Vega Vidal)
 Los Europeos (2019, dir. Víctor García León)
 Nadia Comaneci: la Gymnaste et le Dictateur (2016, dir. Pola Rapaport)
 Ederly (2016, dir. Piotr Dumala)
 All the Difference (2015, dir. Tod Lending)
 Making-of Behind the Scenes Karl Lagerfeld (2015 for Chanel)
 The Vanished Elephant (2014, dir. Javier Fuentes-León)
 Vezo, (2014, short film, dir. Tod Lending)
 Burden of Silence (2012, dir. Tod Lending) 
 Contracorriente (Undertow) (2010, dir. Javier Fuentes-León)
 The Milk of Sorrow (La Teta Asustada) (2009, dir. Claudia Llosa) 
 Madeinusa (2006, dir. Claudia Llosa) 
 Emue & Furiosa (2004, dir. Fabien Gorgeart)

Other work
 With Tarek Schmidt, original music for Corpo Barocco, the Nunzio Impellizzeri Dance Company, Zurich, 2018
 Soundtrack for Block'hood (video game, José Sanchez, 2017)
 Original music for In.Quieta Rooms, the Nunzio Impellizzeri Dance Company, 2017

Awards and distinctions
 Best Soundtrack at the 2020 International Series Festival of Buenos Aires for the El Dia de Mi Suerte series
 Best Music, New Media, at the 2018 French Film Music Association Awards (Union des compositeurs de musiques de films) for Block'Hood soundtrack
 Best Original Soundtrack Award at the International Film Festival of Annonay, Ardèche, France for Undertow, 2010

Shared awards
 Best Gameplay Award, Games for Change festival, New York City, for Block'hood, 2016 
 Toronto International Film Festival premiere for Javier Fuentes-León's The Vanished Elephant, 2014
 Sundance Film Festival premiere for Tod Lending's short film Vezo, 2014 
 Sundance Film Festival, World Cinema Audience Award Dramatic for Fuentes-León's Undertow, 2011 
 Academy Award nomination, Best Foreign Language Film for Claudia Llosa's The Milk of Sorrow, 2010 
 The Golden Bear at the 2009 Berlin International Film Festival for The Milk of Sorrow

References

External links

Dutch film score composers
French film score composers
French women film score composers
French people of Turkish descent
French people of Dutch descent
Living people
Year of birth missing (living people)
Dutch women composers
French women composers